Luke Adam (born June 18, 1990) is a Canadian professional ice hockey centre who is currently playing with the Straubing Tigers of the Deutsche Eishockey Liga (DEL). He previously played in the National Hockey League (NHL) for the Buffalo Sabres, Columbus Blue Jackets. Adam was drafted by Buffalo in the second round, 44th overall, in the 2008 NHL Entry Draft.

Playing career
Adam began his major junior hockey career with the St. John's Fog Devils of the Quebec Major Junior Hockey League (QMJHL). He played there for two seasons before being drafted by the Buffalo Sabres in the 2008 NHL Entry Draft. The Fog Devils moved to Montreal to become the Montreal Juniors before the 2008–09 season. Adam played there before being traded to the Cape Breton Screaming Eagles. Adam was selected to play for Canada at the 2010 World Junior Ice Hockey Championships in Saskatoon, Saskatchewan.

On October 26, 2010, Adam made his NHL debut in an away game against the Philadelphia Flyers in a 6–3 Sabres loss. On December 7, 2010, Adam recorded his first NHL goal in an away game against the Boston Bruins.

Adam was tied for the most goals in the American Hockey League (AHL) for the Rochester Americans when he was recalled by the Sabres on November 19, 2013.

On December 16, 2014, Adam was traded to the Columbus Blue Jackets in exchange for Jerry D'Amigo.

On July 3, 2015, Adam signed a one-year, two-way contract as a free agent with the New York Rangers. After attending the Rangers' 2015 training camp, he was reassigned for the duration of the 2015–16 season to the club's AHL affiliate, the Hartford Wolf Pack. In 59 games with Hartford, he scored 12 goals and 29 points.

In October 2016, Adam signed with Adler Mannheim of the Deutsche Eishockey Liga (DEL) in Germany.

Following the 2018–19 season, helping Adler Mannheim claim the DEL championship, Adam left as a free agent after three seasons and agreed to a two-year contract with Düsseldorfer EG on May 3, 2019. In the 2019–20 season, Adam contributed with 14 goals and 30 points through 48 regular season games for DEG before the season was cancelled due to the COVID-19 pandemic.

After just one season in Düsseldorf, Adam opted to leave the club and signed a one-year deal with his third DEL club, the Nürnberg Ice Tigers, on November 20, 2020.

On July 2, 2022, Adam as a free agent continued his tenure in Germany after he was signed to a one-year contract with Straubing Tigers for the 2022–23 season.

Personal life
Adam's father, Russ, played eight games in the NHL for the Toronto Maple Leafs in the 1982–83 season.

Career statistics

Regular season and playoffs

International

Awards and honours

References

External links

1990 births
Living people
Adler Mannheim players
Buffalo Sabres draft picks
Buffalo Sabres players
Canadian ice hockey centres
Cape Breton Screaming Eagles players
Columbus Blue Jackets players
Düsseldorfer EG players
Hartford Wolf Pack players
Ice hockey people from Newfoundland and Labrador
Iserlohn Roosters players
Montreal Junior Hockey Club players
Nürnberg Ice Tigers players
Portland Pirates players
Rochester Americans players
Sportspeople from St. John's, Newfoundland and Labrador
St. John's Fog Devils players
Straubing Tigers players
Canadian expatriate ice hockey players in Germany